One Eye to Morocco is a solo studio album by English Deep Purple vocalist Ian Gillan. The album material was written during the gap of Deep Purple's 2008 world tour, in the US. It was released on 6 March 2009 on Edel Records as CD, Limited Edition CD and Vinyl.

Background
As Gillan himself tells, he was in the Jewish-quarter of Kraków listening to the related stories of Oskar Schindler when the voice faded – and then returned and somebody told him: 'Ah, Ian you have one eye to Morocco.' – It was Tomasz Dziubiński. Ian didn't understand the meaning of this Polish idiom, until he was told the whole idiom: "To have one eye to Morocco and another to Caucasus". The idiom describes a cross-eyed, or wandering eye person. This idiom inspired Gillan to make another solo album, and the title for the album was set to "One Eye to Morocco."

Recording
In spring 2008 there was a gap between Purple's World Tour, as bassist Roger Glover's mother had died, so Gillan returned to Buffalo to do something new. In a short period of time, with his former bandmate Steve Morris, Ian wrote more than thirty songs. The recording of the album took place in Metalworks Studios, Mississauga, Ontario. Twelve songs were chosen for the album and all of them were recorded in just three days. Recording was mixed and engineered by Nick Blagona, who has previously worked with Deep Purple and mixed Purple's reunion album Perfect Strangers, as well as The House of Blue Light and Slaves & Masters. Also guitarist Michael Lee Jackson contributed to the album.

Music style
Ian Gillan said himself: "It was a conscious decision to avoid the use of a rock rhythm section and you will notice the complete absence of guitar and keyboard solos – we get the very best of all that from Deep Purple. So the instrumentation is perhaps more seductive than thrusting."

Track listing
 "One Eye to Morocco" (Gillan, Morris) – 4:05
 "No Lotion for That" (Gillan, Morris) – 3:11
 "Don't Stop" (Gillan, Appleby) – 2:35
 "Change My Ways" (Gillan) – 3:26
 "Girl Goes to Show" (Gillan, Morris) – 3:59
 "Better Days" (Jackson) – 4:07
 "Deal with It" (Gillan, Morris) – 3:44
 "Ultimate Groove" (Jackson) – 3:48
 "The Sky Is Falling Down" (Gillan, Morris) – 4:09
 "Texas State of Mind" (Jackson) – 3:49
 "It Would Be Nice" (Gillan, Morris) – 3:10
 "Always the Traveller" (Gillan, Morris) – 3:17
 "Lonely Days" (bonus track)
 "She Thinks It's a Crime" (bonus track)

Singles 
 "One Eye to Morocco / Better Days" (For promotional use only)

Formats
One Eye To Morocco was released as CD, Vinyl LP and Limited Edition CD+Vinyl (Doppel CD).

Band
Ian Gillan – vocals, harmonica
Michael Lee Jackson – guitars
Rodney Appleby – bass
Howard Wilson – drums
Steve Morris – guitars
Joe Mennonna – saxophones
Lance Anderson – Hammond organ
Jesse O'Brien – keyboards
Brownman Ali – flugelhorn
Jaro Jarosil – cello
The Gillanaires – backing vocals

Production
Produced, engineered, mixed and mastered by Nick Blagona –
Executive producers: Michael Lee Jackson, Drew Thompson
Basic tracks recorded at Metalworks Studios, Mississauga, Ontario, Canada
Additional recordings at Psychotropic Studios, Dundas, Ontario, Canada
Rehearsal at the Town Ballroom, Buffalo, New York
Calligraphy: Katarina Dorch
Photo: Bob Mussell
Artwork: Patrizio Squeglia

Chart performance

References 

2009 albums
Ian Gillan albums
Edel AG albums
Albums produced by Nick Blagona